Junoon is a Pakistani sufi rock band founded in 1990 by lead guitarist and only original member, Salman Ahmad. The band has released seven studio albums, as well as numerous live albums, compilations, singles, video albums, music videos, and soundtracks. Keyboardist Nusrat Hussain left the band after the first studio album release and was replaced by bassist Brian O'Connell. They released their self-titled debut album in 1991; which barely made a dent in the Pakistani music industry. Guitarist Mekaal Hasan  and band producer John Alec replaced O'Connell, and have been playing bass for live shows since O'Connell's departure.

Although Junoon has been prominent in their home country since the release of their first single, "Talaash" (1993) and debut self-titled album Junoon, they did not achieve worldwide fame until the release of the albums Inquilaab, Azadi and Parvaaz, which were released in 1996, 1997 and 1999 respectively. Their 1997 album, Azadi, which has sold more than half million copies, and hit platinum sales status in a record of four weeks. Their biggest hit single, "Sayonee" (1997), became an instant hit in South Asia and the Middle East, shooting to the top of all the Asian charts, and staying at #1 on both Channel V and MTV Asia for over two months. The band produced an overall two singles and two music videos from the album, the other single being "Yaar Bina".

Later two years after the release of the seventh studio album, Dewaar, vocalist Ali Azmat left the band to pursue his own career as a solo music artist. Guitarist Salman Ahmad also released a solo album in 2005.

Junoon is South Asia's most successful band with more than 30 million sold albums worldwide. Although Junoon's two other members, Ali Azmat  and Brain O'Connell, left the band in 2005, Salman Ahmad continues to perform as a solo artist under the "Junoon" label and has moved to New York City after his solo career failed to take off in Pakistan.

Studio albums

Soundtracks

Compilation albums

Live albums

Video albums

See also
List of Junoon songs

References

External links
Junoon.com - Official Website
Junoon discography at Official Website

Junoon discography at Billboard

Discography
Discographies of Pakistani artists
Rock music group discographies

simple:Junoon (band)